Anthonia  is a Swedish, Danish, and Finnish feminine given name that is a form of Antonia that is used in Finland, Denmark, Sweden, Republic of Karelia, Estonia and Greenland.

Notable individuals with the name include:
 Anthonia Adenike Adeniji (born 1971), Nigerian academic
 Anthonia Fatunsin, Nigerian archeologist
 Anthonia Kleinhoonte (1887–1960), Dutch botanist and experimentalist

See also

Notes

Danish feminine given names
Finnish feminine given names
Swedish feminine given names
Feminine given names